Harry Robbins Haldeman (October 27, 1926 – November 12, 1993) was an American political aide and businessman, best known for his service as White House Chief of Staff to President Richard Nixon and his consequent involvement in the Watergate scandal.

Born in California, Haldeman served in the Navy Reserves in World War II and attended UCLA. In 1949, he joined the J. Walter Thompson advertising agency, where he worked for 20 years as a prominent advertising executive in both Los Angeles and New York City. He made a name for himself early in Los Angeles social circles from his work as chairman of the UCLA Alumni Association and a member of the University of California Board of Regents.

A long family association with the Republican Party and his own interest drew Haldeman to politics. In the 1950s, he became acquainted with Nixon, for whom he developed both an intense respect and steadfast loyalty. He began as an advance man on President Dwight D. Eisenhower's reelection campaign in 1956, again worked as an advance man on Nixon's 1960 presidential campaign, and managed Nixon's 1962 run for governor of California. When Nixon was elected President in 1968, he selected Haldeman as his chief of staff.

Haldeman is credited with implementing more significant changes to White House staffing systems and Executive Branch governance and operations than any chief of staff before him or since, and it is the "Haldeman system" that presidential administrations continue to operate on today. His intensity and no-nonsense management style earned him a reputation as a stern taskmaster who expected top-notch performance.

After he left the Nixon administration in April 1973, Haldeman was tried on counts of perjury, conspiracy, and obstruction of justice for his role in the Watergate cover-up. He was found guilty and imprisoned for 18 months. Upon Haldeman's release, he returned to private life and was a successful businessman and real estate developer until his death from cancer in 1993 at the age of 67.

Early life
Haldeman was born in Los Angeles on October 27, 1926, one of three children of socially prominent parents. His father, Harry Francis Haldeman, founded and ran a successful heating and air conditioning supply company, and gave time and financial support to local Republican causes, including the Richard Nixon financial fund that led to the so-called "Fund Crisis" during the 1952 presidential race. His mother, Katherine (née Robbins), was a longtime volunteer with the Salvation Army and other philanthropic organizations. His paternal grandfather, Harry Marston Haldeman, co-founded the Better America Federation of California, The Oz Film Manufacturing Company, and a gentleman's club named The Uplifters. Young Haldeman and his siblings were raised as Christian Scientists. Known to his peers as a "straight arrow", he sported his trademark flat-top haircut from his high school years – a look that he would adopt for most of his life until after his resignation as Chief of Staff – enjoyed discussions of ethics, and achieved the rank of Life Scout. He attended Harvard School, an elite boys prep school, during which time he met Joanne "Jo" Horton, who was attending Marlborough School, an elite, private secondary school which educated women in the 7th to 12th grades. The two married in 1949.

During World War II he was in the United States Navy Reserve but did not see active combat. Haldeman attended the University of Redlands and the University of Southern California, then transferred to the University of California, Los Angeles (UCLA). He received his B.A. from UCLA in 1948, where he was a member of Beta Theta Pi fraternity. At UCLA, he met John Ehrlichman, who became a close friend and colleague in the Nixon administration.

Career
In 1949, he joined the J. Walter Thompson advertising agency, where he worked for 20 years in both Los Angeles and New York City; other employees of this firm during this period included Ronald Ziegler, who went on to serve as White House Press Secretary in the Nixon administration.

A long family association with the Republican Party and his own interest drew Haldeman to politics and during this period he commenced working for Richard Nixon, for whom he developed both an intense respect and steadfast loyalty. Beginning as an advance man on Nixon's 1956 and 1960 campaigns, Haldeman managed Nixon's 1962 run for governor of California, and when Nixon was elected President in 1968, he chose Haldeman to be his chief of staff.

Nixon administration

When Haldeman's appointment to the White House was announced, Robert Rutland, a close friend and presidential scholar, urged him to start keeping a daily diary recording the major events of each day and Haldeman's thoughts on them. Haldeman took this suggestion and started keeping and maintaining a daily diary throughout his entire career in the Nixon White House (January 18, 1969 – April 30, 1973). The full text of the diaries is almost 750,000 words, and an abridged version was published as The Haldeman Diaries after Haldeman's death. A full version is available to researchers at the Richard Nixon Presidential Library and Museum.

Gaining a reputation as a stern taskmaster who expected top-notch work, he and John Ehrlichman were called "the Berlin Wall" by other White House staffers in a play on their German family names and shared penchant for keeping others away from Nixon and serving as his "gatekeepers". They became Nixon's most loyal and trusted aides during his presidency. Both were keen in protecting what they regarded as Nixon's best interests. He and the president were very close – Haldeman was even dubbed "the president's son-of-a-bitch" – and Nixon relied on him to filter information that came into his office and to make sure that information was properly dispensed.

Role in Watergate

Haldeman was one of the various key figures in the Watergate scandal.

The "Smoking Gun" tape revealed that Nixon instructed Haldeman to have the CIA pressure the FBI into dropping its Watergate investigation. Nixon instructed him to tell the CIA that the investigation would "open up the whole Bay of Pigs thing again". In his book, Haldeman later wrote: "It seems that in all those references to the Bay of Pigs, he was actually referring to the Kennedy assassination." He also said that Nixon might have been reminding CIA Director Richard Helms that the CIA assassination attempts on Fidel Castro may have triggered the assassination of Kennedy.

The unexplained  minute gap in Nixon's Oval Office recordings occurred during a discussion that included the President and Haldeman on June 20, 1972.

Nixon requested the resignations of Haldeman and Ehrlichman in what has been described as a long and emotional meeting at Camp David. Haldeman resigned, and the resignations were announced on April 30, 1973. In a phone conversation shortly after the resignations, Nixon told Haldeman that he loved him like his brother. On the eve of Nixon's resignation, Haldeman asked for a full pardon along with a full pardon of Vietnam War draft dodgers. He argued that pardoning the draft dodgers would take some of the heat off him. Nixon refused.

On January 1, 1975, Haldeman was convicted of conspiracy, obstruction of justice, and three counts of perjury. He was sentenced to serve  to 8 years, subsequently commuted to 1 to 4 years. In Lompoc Federal Prison, Haldeman worked in a facility testing sewage. On December 20, 1978, after serving 18 months, Haldeman was released on parole.

The Ends of Power
In 1978, Times Books published The Ends of Power, written by Haldeman with the writer Joseph DiMona. Haldeman wrote in the book that Nixon had initiated the break-in and had participated in the cover-up from the onset.

A passage in The Ends of Power has been claimed to support allegations linking Watergate to the assassination of John F. Kennedy.

Oliver Stone's 1995 film Nixon, in which Haldeman was portrayed by James Woods, presents the scenario that Nixon attempted to use the CIA's hidden anti-Castro history to help cover up his own misdeeds during Watergate. Stone credited the comments attributed to Haldeman in The Ends of Power as the source for his scenario.

According to the political commentator Chris Matthews, Haldeman denied writing those words and said the theory of events actually belonged to DiMona. Matthews reported that Haldeman said he had no idea of what Nixon meant by the "whole Bay of Pigs thing" comments. Noting that Stone had implicated Nixon as having a role in planning a plot to kill Castro, Howard Rosenberg described it as "one of the most controversial themes of his movie". A response by Nixon writers Steven Rivele and Christopher Wilkinson stated that DiMona, Haldeman's ghostwriter, had confirmed that it was Haldeman's conclusion that "the Bay of Pigs thing" was a code for the Kennedy assassination.

Later life
In his post-prison years, Haldeman went on to a successful career as a businessman, taking an interest in hotels, development, real estate, and chain restaurants in Florida.

Death
On November 12, 1993, after refusing medical treatment in accordance with his Christian Science beliefs, Haldeman died of abdominal cancer at his home in Santa Barbara, California. He was survived by his wife of almost 45 years, the former Joanne Horton, and their four children – Susan, Harry (Hank), Peter, and Ann.

Upon Haldeman's death, Richard Nixon said in a statement, "I have known Bob Haldeman to be a man of rare intelligence, strength, integrity and courage. He played an indispensable role in turbulent times as our Administration undertook a broad range of initiatives at home and abroad." His White House diaries were released posthumously as The Haldeman Diaries in 1994.

See also
 Operation Sandwedge

References

Further reading
 
 Haldeman, Joanne H. (2017).  In The Shadow Of The White House. Vireo/Rare Bird. .

External links 
 H.R. Haldeman testifying at the Watergate Hearings WETA-TV, 1973 Watergate Hearings
 Washington Post profile of Haldeman
 Washington Post Haldeman Obituary
 Ford Library & Museum:The Watergate Files
 Ron Schuler's Parlour Tricks: H.R. Haldeman
 Watergate trial of H.R. Haldeman, courtroom sketches.
 The Testimony of John Ehrlichman & H. R. Haldeman at Smithsonian Folkways

1926 births
1993 deaths
20th-century American businesspeople
20th-century American memoirists
American campaign managers
American Christian Scientists
American diarists
American government officials convicted of crimes
California politicians convicted of crimes
California Republicans
Deaths from cancer in California
Deaths from stomach cancer
Harvard-Westlake School alumni
Military personnel from California
Nixon administration personnel
People convicted in the Watergate scandal
People convicted of obstruction of justice
United States Navy personnel of World War II
United States Navy reservists
University of Southern California alumni
University of California, Los Angeles alumni
White House Chiefs of Staff
Writers from Los Angeles